Bernhard Seifert (born 15 February 1993) is a German athlete specializing in the javelin throw. He represented Germany at the 2020 Summer Olympics in the javelin throw.

Career
Seifert was awarded the 2019 Fair Play Prize of German Sports after he allowed Julian Weber to take his spot at the 2019 World Athletics Championships.

Seifert represented Germany at the 2020 Summer Olympics in the javelin throw.

International competitions

References

1993 births
Living people
Athletes (track and field) at the 2020 Summer Olympics
German male javelin throwers
Olympic athletes of Germany
People from Hildburghausen
Sportspeople from Thuringia